Mathon (Romansh: Maton) is a former municipality in the Viamala Region in the Swiss canton of Graubünden. On 1 January 2021 the former municipalities of Casti-Wergenstein, Donat, Lohn and Mathon merged to form the new municipality of Muntogna da Schons.

History
Mathon is first mentioned about 840 as in Mentaune.

Geography
Of this area, 66.3% is used for agricultural purposes, while 10% is forested. Of the rest of the land, 1.4% is settled (buildings or roads) and the remainder (22.3%) is non-productive (rivers, glaciers or mountains).

Before 2017, the former municipality was located in the Schams sub-district, of the Hinterrhein district, after 2017 it was part of the Viamala Region.

Demographics
Mathon had a population (as of 2019) of 53.  Over the last 10 years the population has decreased at a rate of 14.1%.

, the gender distribution of the population was 56.4% male and 43.6% female.  The age distribution, in Mathon is; 12 people or 23.1% of the population are between 0 and 9 years old.  6 people or 11.5% are 10 to 14, and 1 person or 1.9% is 15 to 19.  Of the adult population, 3 people or 5.8% of the population are between 20 and 29 years old.  8 people or 15.4% are 30 to 39, 6 people or 11.5% are 40 to 49, and 2 people or 3.8% are 50 to 59.  The senior population distribution is 6 people or 11.5% of the population are between 60 and 69 years old, 6 people or 11.5% are 70 to 79, there is 1 person or 1.9% who is 80 to 89, and 1 person who is 90 to 99.

In the 2007 federal election the most popular party was the SVP which received 66.9% of the vote.  The next three most popular parties were the SPS (19.2%), the FDP (12.3%) and the CVP (1.5%).

In Mathon about 78.3% of the population (between age 25-64) have completed either non-mandatory upper secondary education or additional higher education (either university or a Fachhochschule).

Mathon has an unemployment rate of 0.83%.  , there were 17 people employed in the primary economic sector and about 8 businesses involved in this sector.   people are employed in the secondary sector and there are  businesses in this sector.  8 people are employed in the tertiary sector, with 3 businesses in this sector.

The historical population is given in the following table:

Languages
Most of the population speaks Romansh (53.8%), with the rest speaking German (46.2%).  The municipality is about evenly divided between German-speaking and Romansh-speaking population. Although 87% of the population understands Romansch, German is now the sole official language.

References

External links
 Official Web site

Muntogna da Schons
Former municipalities of Graubünden